Artemio Villaseñor Panganiban Jr. (born December 7, 1936) is a Filipino jurist. He served as the 21st Supreme Court Chief Justice of the Philippines from 2005 to 2006.

Early life and education
Panganiban was born on December 7, 1936, in Manila in a poor family. His parents were Artemio Panganiban Sr. and Patricia Villaseñor. He graduated with "Honorable Mention" from the Juan Luna Elementary School in 1950. He also finished with "Honorable Mention" from the Victorino Mapa High School in1954.

Panganiban was granted a University of the Philippines scholarship, but failed to enroll because his impoverished parents could not afford the then 15-centavo bus ride between Diliman and the family's small rented apartment in Cataluna Street, Sampaloc, Manila (nonetheless he was bestowed in 1998 with a membership in the UP Chapter of the Phi Kappa Phi honor society). He earned a degree of Associate in Arts summa cum laude at the Far Eastern University in 1956. He also earned a degree of Bachelor of Laws, and graduated cum laude also at the Far Eastern University in 1960. Prior to his graduation, he was named as the 1959 "Most Outstanding Stuudent" of Far Eastern University. In the 1960 Philippine Bar Examination, he placed sixth, with a rating of 89.55%. In 1997, he was given an honorary doctorate degree in law by the University of Iloilo. He was a founder and former president of the National Union of Students of the Philippines from 1958 to 1959 and legal consultant to the Education Secretary and to the National Board of Education from 1963 to 1965. Panganiban was also conferred a Doctor of Laws (Honoris Causa) degree by the Far Eastern University in 2002, by the University of Cebu in 2006, by Angeles University, in 2006, and by the Bulacan State University, in 2006.

Professional career
Panganiban started as an Associate Lawyer and apprentice of Jovito Salonga at the Salonga, Ordoñez and Associates Law Office from 1961 to 1963. According to Panganiban, his biggest heroes were Jose W. Diokno, the father of human rights, Salonga his mentor, and future Chief Justice Claudio Teehankee; Panganiban could not find sufficient funds to continue his scholarship offer in Yale, so Salonga, a Yale alumnus, brought him under his wing to teach him all he learned from Yale and all he knew of the law. In 1963, the young Panganiban formed his own law firm PABLAW (Panganiban, Benitez, Parlade, Africa and Barinaga Law Offices), which he headed until he joined the Supreme Court in 1995. He also became the vice president of the Legal Management Council of the Philippines from 1976 to 1977. He was the Vice President for Legal Affairs and General Counsel, Philippine Chamber of Commerce and Industry (PCCI), 1991–1995. He was Chief Legal Counsel of the Parish Pastoral Council for Responsible Voting (PPCRV), 1991–1995, and the only Filipino appointed by Pope John Paul II to the Pontifical Council for the Laity. He was Legal Counsel of the Manila Archdiocesan and Parochial Schools Association – MAPSA from May 7, 1993 – October 9, 1995. He was Chair of  Workshop on Administration of Justice, Multi-Sectoral Conference convened to discuss the first 100-day and first 1,000-day programs of President Fidel Ramos, held on June 13, 1992, and on October 17, 1992, respectively.

He taught law and political science at the Far Eastern University, Assumption Convent, and San Sebastian College from 1961 to 1970. He became a bank director of the International Corporate Bank (which is now owned by the Union Bank of the Philippines) from 1972 to 1974.

From 1978 to 1981, he was a consultant of the World Tourism Organization and was an honorary consul of the Republic of Honduras from 1981 to 1983. He was the president of Arpan Tourism Industries Corp. from 1974 to 1993 and Baron Travel Corporation from 1967 to 1993.

Panganiban was the Chief legal counsel of the Liberal Party from 1987 to 1991 and was president of the Philippine Daily Inquirer from 1991 to 1992.

He was also the governor of the Management Association of the Philippines and president of the Rotary Club of Manila. He was also the former president of Philippine-Finland Association and RCM Eyebank Foundation Inc.

Panganiban's 2008 occupation is: Philippine Daily Inquirer column writer; adviser, consultant and/or independent director of several business, civic, non-government and religious groups.

Supreme Court

Panganiban was named as Associate Justice of the Supreme Court in 1995. Justice Panganiban was the chairperson of the Supreme Court Third Division and the House of Representatives Electoral Tribunal (HRET), as well as of seven SC committees involved mainly in judicial reforms.  Described by a colleague (Justice Antonio T. Carpio) as “undoubtedly the most prolific writer of the Court, bar none” he has during the last ten years penned more than 1,000 full-length decisions and ten books plus several thousand minute resolutions disposing of controversies. These include the Cocofed case, in which the court gave the Presidential Commission on Good Government the right to vote sequestered United Coconut Planters Bank shares, which had been acquired through coco levy funds.

2001 EDSA revolution
Panganiban was also known for his controversial role in helping install then Vice President Gloria Macapagal Arroyo as president in 2001 after the downfall of Joseph Estrada.

In his book "Reforming the Judiciary," Panganiban recounted that on the morning of January 20, 2001, militants had threatened to march toward Don Chino Roces (Mendiola) Bridge, where Estrada supporters were encamped, unless he resigned. Chaos could have ensued, especially because the government machinery had fallen down, Panganiban said in his book.

He also worried that the Vice President could not act because Estrada was still the legal leader. On the other hand, a coup d'état might be staged, and that could obliterate the Constitution. These led Panganiban to conclude that "the only way to avert violence, chaos and bloodshed and to save our democratic system from collapse was to have Mrs. Arroyo sworn in as Acting President."

He added: "After prayer and reflection, I summoned the courage to call up Chief Justice Hilario Davide Jr. about 5:30 a.m. to explain to him my apprehensions. I proposed that, to save the Constitution, he should swear in GMA (Arroyo) by 12 noon of that day." Arroyo became president that day.

When the question of Arroyo's legitimacy arose, Davide and Panganiban recused themselves from the Supreme Court proceedings. On March 2, 2001, the court voted 13–0 to uphold Arroyo's ascension to the top post.
A month later, the court again voted 13–0 to deny with finality Estrada's motion for reconsideration.

Chief Justice
Justice Panganiban was named Supreme Court Chief Justice on December 20, 2005, by President Gloria Macapagal Arroyo after Hilario Davide Jr. retired at age 70. Other nominees by the Judicial and Bar Council included Senior Associate Justice Reynato Puno and Associate Justice Leonardo Quisumbing. Puno was the most senior in terms of career in the Supreme Court while Panganiban was the most senior in terms of age. Panganiban was succeeded by Puno after only two years in office in December 2007. Short-term tenures of high-ranking appointees are a distinctive feature of the Philippine political system.

Chief Justice Panganiban drew controversy for his remarks made in June 2006 regarding the 1998 decision of the Supreme Court, in which he participated, affirming the death penalty imposed on Leo Echegaray. Echegaray, a convicted rapist was executed the following year in what was the first execution in the Philippines since the regime of Ferdinand Marcos. Panganiban, whose anti-death penalty views are well known, suggested that the Supreme Court may have committed "a judicial error" in executing Echegaray, as not all of the qualifying circumstances needed to promulgate a death conviction were actually established. His remarks, coming at the heels of the passage by Congress of a law abolishing the death penalty, were criticized by death-penalty advocates and some newspaper editorials. Calls were made in some quarters to indemnify the family of Echegaray. Supporters of former President Joseph Estrada were also emboldened to demand that the Supreme Court likewise to correct its 2001 decision upholding the assumption to the presidency of Gloria Macapagal Arroyo in lieu of Estrada. Panganiban subsequently clarified that his remarks on the Echegaray decision were his own personal views and not that of the Supreme Court.

The Philippine Bar Association, on its 116th Foundation Day Celebration on April 26, 2007, conferred upon Art, the "Award of Honor" citing him as

Books
As his way of reporting on his magistracy, Justice Panganiban writes one book a year.  He has authored the following:
 1994 – Love God, Serve Man
 1997 –  Justice and Faith
 1998 – Battles in the Supreme Court
 1999 – Leadership by Example
 2000 – Transparency, Unanimity & Diversity
 2001 – A Centenary of Justice
 2002 – Reforming the Judiciary
 2003 – The Bio Age Dawns on the Judiciary
 2004 – Leveling the Playing Field
 2005 – Judicial Renaissance.
 2006 – Liberty and Prosperity (two volumes)

With Due Respect
On February 12, 2007, Panganiban began writing "With Due Respect" in the Opinion section of the Philippine Daily Inquirer.

Personal life
Panganiban is married to Elenita Alcazar Carpio, a former associate dean and professor of the Asian Institute of Management. Art and Leni were wed at the Immaculate Conception Church in Rosario Heights, Quezon City on April 8, 1961. Leni earned AB-Math, and BSE in St. Scholastica's College, and MA-statistics in UP. They have 5 children: Maria Elena Panganiban-Yaptangco, Jose Artemio III, Maria Jocelyn Panganiban-Hannett, Maria Theresa Panganiban-Manalac and Maria Evelyn Panganiban-Reagan, who all hold graduate degrees from universities in the United States, including Harvard, Stanford, University of California, University of Chicago, University of Michigan and Boston University. He is also an honorary graduate of the San Beda College of Law due to his accomplishments and contributions to the Philippine Legal System. His only son Jose "Archie" Artemio III, currently a Director at Citigroup, New York City, USA, finished with the distinction of being the 2nd student “summa cum laude” since the UP College of Music's birth and of earning the highest average among UP's 3,300 graduates in 1989. Art and Leni have 10 grandchildren, of which, 6 live with their parents in the East Coast, USA: the 4 Hannett sisters, Patricia, Katrina, Victoria and Alexandra; and Joseph and Matt Reagan.
The former Chief Justice is now an Independent Director in GMA Network, Inc., Manila Electric Company, Robinsons Land Corp., Metro Pacific Tollways Corp., Petron Corporation, Bank of the Philippine Islands, Asian Terminals, and Jollibee Foods Corporation.

References

External links

Supreme Court of the Philippines
Website – Spreading the Gospel of Liberty and Prosperity under the Rule of Law 

People from Sampaloc, Manila
Chief justices of the Supreme Court of the Philippines
Associate Justices of the Supreme Court of the Philippines
1936 births
Living people
20th-century Filipino judges
Far Eastern University alumni
GMA Network (company) executives
Philippine Daily Inquirer people
21st-century Filipino judges